"Dimmi che non passa" is the first single by Violetta Zironi, from her debut EP of the same name released on 12 December 2013, the day after the final of season 7 of the Italian version of The X Factor.

Writing and recording
Music and lyrics to the song were written by Italian singer-songwriter and guitar player Christian "Chris" Lavoro. The track is basically a fresh pop song but with a country and folk mood, and has its signature marks in the opening whistle which occurs again after the chorus and before the final, and in the easy-to-remember melody of the chorus, "sticky as a chewing gum" in the words of Mika, Violetta's mentor during the TV show. The song was recorded at Sunset Sound Studio 3 in Milan, during Violetta's stay in The X Factor loft.

Music video
The music video was shot in Milan, Italy in December 2013. It was directed by a team of directors under the alias name of Tom Summers. It was officially released on 23 December 2013.

Live performances
The song was first performed live on 5 December 2013 during the semi-final of The X Factor. Two days later Violetta performed the song on stage again during her first concert after the beginning of the TV show, right before the final; during this performance she turned to English the lyrics to the second chorus. The following week the song was performed again in The X Factor final, held at Mediolanum Forum near Milan, Italy.
Soon after the final, Violetta opened the concert of Italian rock band Elio e le Storie Tese in her hometown Reggio Emilia; in this occasion she sang "Dimmi che non passa" with the sole accompaniment of her ukulele.

Reception
The song peaked at No. 6 in the Italian Top Download Chart the week following its release and has been aired by most Italian radio stations.

Credits and personnel

Recording

Record producer – Michele Canova Iorfida
Engineering – Geoff Neal
Studio Assistant – Morgan Stratton
Additional Recording & Editing – Patrizio "Pat" Simonini
Mixing – Pino "Pinaxa" Pischetola
Mixing assistance – Sean Leonard

Personnel
Drums – Victor Indrizzo
Bass – Sean Hurley
Piano / B3 – Jeff Babko
Acoustic and Electric Guitar – Michael Landau

References

External links

2013 singles
Violetta (singer) songs
2013 songs
Sony Music singles